Staufenberg may refer to:

Staufenberg, Hesse, a town in the district of Gießen, Hesse, Germany
Staufenberg, Lower Saxony, a municipality in the district of Göttingen, Lower Saxony, Germany
Staufenberg (Reinhardswald), a mountain in the Reinhardswald in the district of Kassel, Hesse, Germany
Staufenberg (Vellmar),  a mountain near Vellmar in the district of Kassel, Hesse, Germany
Staufenberg (Gernsbach), a village incorporated into the town of Gernsbach in Baden-Württemberg, Germany

See also
 Stauffenberg, German noble family